Federico Basavilbaso (born 24 March 1974) is an Argentine retired footballer. He played as midfielder mostly in the Primera División Argentina.

References

1974 births
Living people
Footballers from Buenos Aires
Argentine footballers
Association football midfielders
Argentine Primera División players
La Liga players
Segunda División players
Deportivo Español footballers
CD Tenerife players
Argentine expatriate footballers
Expatriate footballers in Spain